Krisse Salminen (born Heidi Kristiina Salminen; 28 May 1976) is a Finnish stand-up comedian and television talkshow hostess. She is the daughter of gameshow host Reijo Salminen. Her shtick is to present herself as a cow-eyed and stuck-up, self-centered blonde girly girl, speaking an exaggerated, urban, Helsinki-style nasal accent. She is one of the central figures of the burgeoning Finnish stand-up scene.

She made an appearance in the Eurovision Song Contest 2007 as a guest host and green room reporter. She has had TV shows called Krisse Show and Krisse Road Show. She appeared on the 2012 series of Tanssii tähtien kanssa, the Finnish version of Strictly Come Dancing, with professional partner Matti Puro. She just won with 57% of the vote.

Awards
 Telvis (2003): Best TV actress
 Venla (2003): Best performer
 Telvis (2004): Best TV actress
 Telvis (2005): Best TV actress

Filmography

TV series 
 Krisse (2004–2005)
 Krisse Show (2006–2007)
 Krisse Road Show (2007)
 Röyhkeä diplomaatti (2007)
 Ne Salmiset (2009–2010)
 Krissen vaaligrilli (2011–)
 YleLeaks (2013)

Films 
 Robots (2005) (Finnish voice of Piper)
 Keisarin salaisuus (2006) (voice)
 Shrek the Third (2007) (Finnish voice of Snow White)
 Toy Story 3 (2010) (Finnish voice of Barbie)

External links
 
 Krisse Road Show 

1976 births
Living people
People from Hollola
Finnish stand-up comedians
Finnish television presenters
Finnish women comedians
Finnish women television presenters
Finnish voice actresses